The Sanremo Music Festival 1955 was the fifth annual Sanremo Music Festival, held at the Sanremo Casino in Sanremo, province of Imperia between 27 and 29 January 1955. The show was presented by television presenter Armando Pizzo, assisted by Maria Teresa Ruta.
 
According to the rules of this edition every song was performed in a double performance by a couple of singers or groups, with some artists performing multiple songs.

The winner of the Festival was "Buongiorno tristezza", performed by Claudio Villa and Tullio Pane.

Participants and results

References 

Sanremo Music Festival by year
1955 in Italian music
1955 in Italian television
1955 music festivals